ASTOR may refer to:
 Mark 45 torpedo, Anti-Submarine TORpedo
 Raytheon Sentinel, Airborne STand-Off Radar

See also
 Astor (disambiguation)